Srđan Drašković  (born 8 January 1991) is a Serbian footballer who plays for Sileks.

Club career
Born in Kraljevo, Drašković started playing football in the local academy Bubamara, after which moved to youth categories of Čukarički. Finally he joined BASK, making a single appearance in the 2009–10 Serbian League Belgrade campaign. Next he moved to the Dunav Zone League side Zvižd, where he stayed between 2010 and 2011. Later he played with Srem and Bane until 2014, when returned to Zvižd. During the second spell with the club, Drašković also captaining team in 2015. At the beginning of 2016, Drašković moved to Šumadija 1903, where he spent the rest of the 2015–15 season in the Serbian League West. In summer 2016, Drašković moved to the Maltese side Victoria Wanderers, where he affirmed as a goal poacher in the 2016–17 Maltese FA Trophy, scoring a twice in the third round 5–0 victory over Mġarr United. In summer 2017, Drašković signed with Serbian First League club ČSK Čelarevo. Following the end of 2017–18 season and relegation in the Serbian League Vojvodina.

References

External links
 
 Srdjan Draskovic at serbiacorner.com
 Srđan Drašković at theplayersagent.com
 Drašković, Srđan at Serbian First League
 Srdjan Draskovic at skvw.org

1991 births
Living people
Sportspeople from Kraljevo
Association football defenders
Serbian footballers
FK BASK players
FK Srem players
FK Bane players
FK Šumadija 1903 players
FK ČSK Čelarevo players
FK Sileks players
Serbian First League players
Serbian expatriate footballers
Serbian expatriate sportspeople in Malta
Expatriate footballers in Malta
Serbian expatriate sportspeople in North Macedonia
Expatriate footballers in North Macedonia
Macedonian First Football League players